The vicars of St Helen's Church, Ashby-de-la-Zouch from 1200 onwards are as follows:

1200 Roger
1224 Reginald
1240 Elias
1246 Elias de Roger
1304 John de Esseby
1314 William de Bromyard
1315 William Lucas de Viterton
1349 Richard Page
1350 William de Donnton
1364 Elias de Trykingham
1413 John de Burton
1414 William Pepur
1455 William Ederyche
1456 Robert Sharpe
1463 Henry Dalkyns
1477 John Harrison
1504 Edward Fox
1508 William Shelton
1533 Patrick Chevir
1534 John Grevys
1552 George Harrison
1564 Anthony Gilby
1583 Nathaniel Gilby
1584 Thomas Wyddowes
1593 Arthur Hildersham
1632 Anthony Watson
1646 William Coke
1652 Ithiel Smart
1662 Alexander Jones
1671 Gowyn Knight
1673 Francis Chapman
1676 Ithiel Smart
1691 Henry Hooton
1693 John Lord
1711 Anthony Johnson
1715 Joseph Smith
1721 Samuel Holbrooke
1729 Peter Cowper
1783 John Prior
1804 William MacDowell
1828 Robert Behoe Radcliffe
1833 Charles Dundas
1834 Canon Marmaduke Vavasour
1875 Canon John Denton
1903 Percy Rawson Preston
1906 Canon Herbert Edward Sawyer
1923 Basil Charles Floyd Andrewes
1928 Francis Horace Jones
1931 Canon Hugh Duncan Hanford
1958 Francis Michael Ambrose Payne
1963 Canon John Edward Bowers
1989 Charles Philip Dobbin
2002 Brian Robertson

References

English priests
Vicars